Mongolian barbecue is a stir fried dish that was developed in Taiwan during 1950s. Despite its name, the dish is not Mongolian and is only loosely related to barbecue.

Origin

Mongolian barbecue was created by Taiwanese comedian and restaurateur Wu Zhaonan. While he initially wished to name the dish "Beijing barbecue", due to political sensitivity associated with the city which had been recently designated as the capital of the  People's Republic of China, the name "Mongolian barbecue" was chosen despite the lack of connection to Mongolia.

Wu's food stall attracted a wide clientele including diplomats and wealthy business people despite being a relatively cheap and unsophisticated dish, however it was later destroyed by flooding originating from a typhoon during which Wu almost drowned. He was later able to develop a highly successful career as a comedian thus exiting the restaurant business, meanwhile numerous imitators emerged to capitalize on the popularity of the dish he created, the prominent examples include Genghis Khan, Tang Palace, Great Khan, and Heavenly Khan. The dish was later successfully introduced outside Taiwan.

Preparation

Typically, diners select a variety of raw ingredients from a display of sliced meat (such as beef, pork, lamb, turkey, chicken, and shrimp) and vegetables (such as cabbage, tofu, onion, broccoli, and mushrooms). The bowl of ingredients is handed to the chef who then adds the diner's choice of sauce and are transferred to a grill.

The circular shape of the grill allows two or more chefs to cook food simultaneously and quickly and the food is typically prepared as the grill is revolved around. Oil or water may be added while the ingredients are stir-fried continuously over the high heat with the food items remain intact.

Some American chains place the food on different parts of the round grill separated by a special wedge shaper. Each dish is stirred in its turn, as the operator walks around the outside of the grill and turns each individual's food in succession.

When cooking is complete, each finished dish is scooped into a bowl and handed to the diner. Many Mongolian barbecue restaurants follow an all-you-can-eat buffet format, allowing multiple visits to the grill.

See also
 Asado
 Bulgogi, a popular Korean stir-fried grill dish
 Jingisukan, a popular Japanese stir-fried grill dish
 Khorkhog, a Mongolian dish referred to as "Mongolian barbecue"
 Korean BBQ refers to a variety of grilled dishes in Korean cuisine
 List of Taiwanese inventions and discoveries
 Saj, a convex griddle used in central, south, and west Asia, eastern and Southern Europe and the Caribbean for cooking bread and meat
 Taiwanese cuisine
 Teppanyaki, a similar Japanese style of cooking

Notes

Taiwanese cuisine
Cooking techniques
1951 in Taiwan